Maryam Amir Jalali (December 20, 1947) is an Iranian actress. She won a Hafez Award for her acting in Sour and Sweet (2006)

Career
Maryam Amir Jalali, a cinema and television actress, is best known for her roles in comedy series.

Beginning her professional career as an actress in 1999, she appeared in a number of dramas since then.

Amir Jalali has played roles in movies, such as 'Tehran Nights' (2000), 'Sweet Jam' (2001), 'Daybreak' (2005), 'Hello Mother-in-Law' (2006), 'Red Light' (2009), 'The Extremists' (2009), 'Looking For Happiness' (2009) and 'How I Became a Billionaire' (2010).

Her best-known series include 'Under the Indigo Dome' (1995), 'Hotel' (1998-1999), 'The Story of a City 2' (2000), 'The Entrance Exam' (2002), 'The New Bride' (2002), 'Homeless' (2004), 'The Way of Infatuation' (2004), 'The Suspect Got Away' (2005), 'Sweet and Sour' (2006), 'Checkered' (2007), 'Four Wheels' (2011), 'Family Conspiracy' (2011), 'A Girl Named Ahoo' (2011), 'Restless' (2013) and 'Bad Days Pass' (2013).

Filmography

TV shows

Movies

References

External links
 
 
 Maryam Amir Jalali on Soureh Cinema

Iranian television actresses
Living people
Iranian film actresses
21st-century Iranian actresses
1947 births
People from Hamadan